Mount Morgan is a mountain located in northwestern Inyo County, California, in the John Muir Wilderness of the Inyo National Forest.

Geography
Morgan stands within the endorheic watershed of Owens Lake, now a mostly dry lake since its main source of water, the Owens River, was diverted to supply Los Angeles. The west and north sides of Mt. Morgan drain into Rock Creek, thence into the Owens River. The east and south sides of Morgan drain into Morgan Creek, thence into Pine Creek, and into lower Rock Creek.

Climbing
Morgan can be accessed by trail from Rock Creek Canyon, above Tom's Place on 395. Its trailhead is at the far end of the lake. The trail is well marked the first  to Francis Lake, where it ends.

History
In 1878 members of the Wheeler Survey, who made the first ascent in about 1870, named the mountain for one of its members, J.H. Morgan of Alabama.

See also
List of mountain peaks of California

References

External links
 
 

Mountains of Inyo County, California
Mountains of the John Muir Wilderness
Mount Morgan
Mountains of Northern California